Events from the 1570s in England.

Incumbents
 Monarch – Elizabeth I
 Parliament – 3rd of Queen Elizabeth I (starting 2 April, until 29 May 1571), 4th of Queen Elizabeth I (starting 8 May 1572)

Events
 1570
 25 February – Pope Pius V excommunicates Queen Elizabeth I of England with the papal bull Regnans in Excelsis which is affixed to the door of Old St Paul's Cathedral in London on 24 May.
 Florentine banker Roberto di Ridolfi devises the Ridolfi plot to assassinate Elizabeth and replace her with the Catholic Mary, Queen of Scots.
 Whitechapel Bell Foundry known to be in existence in London. By 2017, when it closes its premises in Whitechapel, it will be the oldest manufacturing company in Great Britain.
 The home and library of John Dee at Mortlake begin to serve as an informal prototype English academy for gentlemen with scientific interests.
 Approximate date – Thomas Tallis composes his 40-part motet Spem in alium.
 1571
 23 January – the Royal Exchange officially opened by Queen Elizabeth.
 April – Treason Act forbids criticism of the monarchy.
 May – All papal bulls declared treasonable by Act of Parliament.
 25 June
 An Act Against Usury permits moneylending at interest rates not exceeding 10%.
 Queen Elizabeth's Grammar School, Horncastle, is founded in Lincolnshire.
 27 June – Establishment of Jesus College "within the City and University of Oxford of Queen Elizabeth's foundation" by Welsh cleric and lawyer Hugh Price.
 25 July – The Free Grammar School of Queen Elizabeth of the Parishioners of the Parish of Saint Olave in the County of Surrey is established in Tooley Street, London.
 29 August – Ridolfi plot discovered. On 7 September Thomas Howard, 4th Duke of Norfolk, is arrested for his part in the conspiracy.
 The first Pro forma bill is introduced, symbolising Parliament's authority over its own affairs.
 Burford School is established in Oxfordshire.
 1572
 13 February – Harrow School founded.
 May – Hexhamshire is annexed to Northumberland.
 2 June – Thomas Howard, 4th Duke of Norfolk, is executed for treason for his part in the Ridolfi plot to restore Catholicism in England.
 11 July – Humphrey Gilbert leads 1500 English volunteers on an expedition to assist the Dutch Sea Beggars in their struggle against Spanish Habsburg rule.
 Formation of 'Thomas Morgan's Company of Foot', a group of 300 volunteers from the London Trained Bands to assist the Dutch, origin of the Buffs (Royal East Kent Regiment). 
 Vagabonds Act, part of the Tudor Poor Laws, prescribes punishment for rogues. This includes actors' companies lacking formal patronage.
 Publication of a revised version of the Bishops' Bible.
 1573
 24 March – Queen Elizabeth's Grammar School for Boys established in Barnet at the petition of Robert Dudley, 1st Earl of Leicester.
 17 April – English troops capture Edinburgh Castle.
 18 December – Francis Walsingham becomes Secretary of State.
 1574
 18 August – Treaty of Bristol settles commercial disputes with Spain.
 Construction of Longleat House completed.
 1575
 March – Spain opens the port of Antwerp to English traders, in return for Queen Elizabeth agreeing to stop aiding Dutch rebels against Spanish rule.
 7 July – Raid of the Redeswire: Sir John Carmichael of Scotland defeats Sir John Forster of England in a border skirmish which will be the last battle between the two kingdoms.
 26 July – Edmund Grindal succeeds Matthew Parker as Archbishop of Canterbury.
 14 November – Elizabeth declines an offer of rule over the Netherlands.
 Christopher Saxton publishes his County Atlas of England and Wales.
 William Byrd and Thomas Tallis are granted a royal monopoly for the publication of most types of music.
 1576
 8 February – Peter Wentworth is imprisoned for speaking in Parliament against royal interference in its affairs.
 11 August – Explorer Martin Frobisher discovers Frobisher Bay whilst searching for the Northwest Passage.
 December – James Burbage opens London's second permanent public playhouse (and the first to have a substantial life), The Theatre, in Shoreditch.
 The following schools are founded in Kent:
 Dartford Grammar School, by William d'Aeth, Edward Gwyn and William Vaughn.
 Sutton Valence School, by William Lambe.
 William Lambarde's Perambulation of Kent (completed 1570) is published, first of the English county histories.
 Composer Thomas Whythorne writes a Booke of songs and sonetts with longe discourses sett with them, an early example of autobiographical writing in English.
 1577
 June – Edmund Grindal suspended for refusing to suppress Puritanism.
 6 July – 'Black Assize' in Oxford results in an outbreak of epidemic typhus killing around three hundred in the city.
 29 November – Catholic seminary priest Cuthbert Mayne is hanged, drawn and quartered at Launceston, Cornwall, for treason, first of the Douai Martyrs.
 13 December – Francis Drake leaves Plymouth aboard the Pelican with four other ships and 164 men on an expedition against the Spanish along the Pacific coast of the Americas which will become a circumnavigation.
 1578
 11 June – Humphrey Gilbert is granted letters patent to establish a colony in North America.
 19 November – Humphrey Gilbert and Walter Raleigh set out from Plymouth leading an expedition to establish a colony in North America; forced to turn back six months later.
 December – Publication of John Lyly's didactic prose romance Euphues: the Anatomy of Wyt, originating the ornate prose style known as Euphuism.
 1579
 23 April – The English College, Rome, is established for the training of Roman Catholic priests to serve in England.
 17 June – Drake claims New Albion on the Pacific coast of North America for England.
 June – Humphrey Gilbert sails in an unsuccessful attempt to intercept Spanish forces sailing to support the Second Desmond Rebellion in Ireland.
 17 August – Eastland Company chartered to trade with Scandinavia and the Baltic Sea states.
 Publication of Edmund Spenser's poetry The Shepheardes Calender, anonymously.

Births
 1570
 22 January – Robert Bruce Cotton, politician (died 1631)
 13 April – Guy Fawkes, Gunpowder Plot conspirator (hanged 1606)
 28 November – James Whitelocke, judge (died 1632)
 John Cooper, composer and lutenist (died 1626)
 John Farmer, composer (died 1601)
 Simon Grahame, Scottish-born adventurer (died 1614)
 1571
 ? March – Barnabe Barnes, poet (died 1609)
 Henry Ainsworth, Nonconformist clergyman and scholar (died 1622)
 William Bedell, Anglican churchman (died 1642)
 Charles Butler, beekeeper and philologist (died 1647)
 Bartholomew Gosnold, lawyer and explorer (died 1607)
 Thomas Storer, poet (died 1604)
Thomas Wintour, Gunpowder Plot conspirator (hanged 1606)
 1572
 22 January – John Donne, writer and prelate (died 1631)
 c. 3 March – Robert Catesby, leader of the Gunpowder Plot (killed 1605)
 11 June – Ben Jonson, dramatist (died 1637)
 John Floyd, Jesuit (died 1649)
 James Mabbe, scholar and poet (died 1642)
 1573
 15 July – Inigo Jones, architect (died 1652)
 7 October – William Laud, Archbishop of Canterbury (died 1645)
 Richard Johnson, romance writer (died 1659)
 John Kendrick, merchant (died 1624)
 1574
 7 March (bapt.) – John Wilbye, composer (died 1638)
 June – Richard Barnfield, poet (died 1627)
 1 July – Joseph Hall, bishop and satirist (died 1656)
 7 August – Robert Dudley, styled Earl of Warwick, explorer and geographer (died 1649)
 4 September – Thomas Gataker, clergyman and theologian (died 1654)
 1575
 5 March – William Oughtred, mathematician (died 1660)
 14 August – Robert Hayman, poet (died 1629)
 Edmund Bolton, historian and poet (died 1633)
 Lionel Cranfield, 1st Earl of Middlesex, successful London merchant (died 1645)
 William Parker, 4th Baron Monteagle (died 1622)
Arbella Stuart, Duchess of Somerset (died 1615)
 Cyril Tourneur, dramatist (died 1626)
 1576
 October – Thomas Weelkes, composer and organist (died 1626)
 7 October – John Marston, writer (died 1634)
 12 October – Thomas Dudley, Governor of Massachusetts Bay Colony (died 1652)
 William Ames, Protestant philosopher (died 1633)
 Possible date – John Carver, first governor of Plymouth Colony (died 1621)
 1577
 8 February – Robert Burton, scholar (died 1640)
 9 July – Thomas West, 3rd Baron De La Warr, governor of Virginia (died 1618)
 11 August (bapt.) – Barnaby Potter, Bishop of Carlisle (died 1642)
 20 November (bapt.) – Samuel Purchas, travel writer (died 1626)
 Robert Cushman, Plymouth Colony settler (died 1625)
 William Noy, lawyer and politician (died 1634)
 Henry Somerset, 1st Marquess of Worcester (died 1646)
 1578
 2 March – George Sandys, traveller (died 1644)
 1 April – William Harvey, physician (died 1657)
 16 May – Everard Digby, Gunpowder Plot conspirator (hanged 1606)
 24 August – John Taylor, "The Water Poet" (died 1653)
 Thomas Coventry, 1st Baron Coventry, lawyer (died 1640)
 Francis Manners, 6th Earl of Rutland (died 1632)
 Ambrose Rookwood, Gunpowder Plot conspirator (hanged 1606)
 1579
 13 July – Arthur Dee, physician and alchemist (died 1651)
 20 December (bapt.) – John Fletcher, playwright (died 1625)
 Jacob Astley, 1st Baron Astley of Reading, royalist commander in the English Civil War (died 1652)

Deaths
 1571
 12 February – Nicholas Throckmorton, diplomat and politician (born 1515)
 1 June – John Story, Catholic lawyer, politician and martyr (executed) (born 1504)
 23 September – John Jewel, bishop (born 1522)
 1572
 January – Robert Pattison, actor (born c. 1535)
 10 March – William Paulet, 1st Marquess of Winchester (born c. 1483)
 2 June – Thomas Howard, 4th Duke of Norfolk (executed) (born 1536)
 24 October – Edward Stanley, 3rd Earl of Derby, politician (born 1508)
 Christopher Tye, composer and organist (born 1505)
 1573
 12 January – William Howard, 1st Baron Howard of Effingham, Lord High Admiral (born 1510)
 14 May (bur.) – Richard Grafton, merchant and printer (born c. 1506/7 or 1511)
 29 July – John Caius, physician (born 1510)
 Late – Reginald Wolfe, printer (year of birth unknown)
 1574
 circa 7 November - Robert White, composer (born 1538)
 1575
 17 May – Matthew Parker, Archbishop of Canterbury (born 1504)
 14 July – Richard Taverner, Bible translator (born 1505)
 1576
 22 September – Walter Devereux, 1st Earl of Essex (born 1541)
 1577
 12 August – Thomas Smith, scholar and diplomat (born 1513)
 7 October – George Gascoigne, poet (born c. 1525)
 29 November – Cuthbert Mayne, recusant Catholic priest and martyr, canonised (executed) (born 1543)
 1578
 7 March – Lady Margaret Douglas, Countess of Lennox, member of the royal family, diplomat (born 1515)
 29 March – Arthur Champernowne, admiral (born 1524)
 20 June – Thomas Doughty, explorer (executed) (year of birth unknown)
 27 July – Jane Lumley, translator (born 1537)
 4 August – Thomas Stucley, adventurer (born 1525)
 December – Nicholas Heath, Archbishop of York and Lord Chancellor (born 1501)
 1579
 20 February – Nicholas Bacon, politician (born 1509)
 20 May – Isabella Markham, courtier (born 1527)
 10 June – William Whittingham, Biblical scholar and religious reformer (born 1524)
 21 November – Thomas Gresham, merchant and financier (born 1519)

References